Gemmula lordhoweensis is a species of sea snail, a marine gastropod mollusk in the family Turridae, the turrids.

Description
The length of the shell attains 21.5 mm, its diameter 7.5 mm.

Distribution
This bathyal species was found on the Lord Howe Rise.

References

External links
 Kantor & Sysoev, Sexual dimorphism in the apertural notch of a new species of Gemmula_(Gastropoda Turridae); Journal of Molluscan Studies 57(2) 1991
  Tucker, J.K. 2004 Catalog of recent and fossil turrids (Mollusca: Gastropoda). Zootaxa 682:1-1295.

lordhoweensis
Gastropods described in 1991